Katarzyna Herman (born 13 August 1971 in Mrągowo) is a Polish actress.

Filmography
 Spoor
 The Lure (2015)
 2013 Oszukane
 2012: In a Bedroom (pol: W sypialni)
Magda M.
Ekipa (TV series)
Kryminalni
M jak miłość
Miasteczko
Boża podszewka

Awards
 2012: Best Actress award at the Koszalin Debut Films Festival.

References

External links

1971 births
Living people
Artists from Białystok